Bawani Khera Assembly constituency is one of the 90 Vidhan Sabha constituencies in Haryana state in northern India. This constituency is reserved for the candidates belonging to the Scheduled castes.

Overview
Bawani Khera (constituency number 59) is one of the 6 Assembly constituencies located in Bhiwani district. This constituency covers the entire Bawani Khera tehsil and part of Bhiwani tehsil.

It is part of Hisar Lok Sabha constituency.

Members of Legislative Assembly
1967: Jagan nath, Indian National Congress
1968 : Subedar Prabhu Singh, Indian National Congress
1972: Amar Singh, Vishal Haryana Party
1977: Jagan nath, Janata Party
1982: Amar Singh, Lok Dal
1987: Jagan nath, Lok Dal
1991: Amar Singh, Haryana Vikas Party 
1996: Jagan nath, Haryana Vikas Party
2000: Ramkishan Fauji, Haryana Vikas Party
2005: Ramkishan Fauji, Indian National Congress
2009: Ramkishan Fauji, Indian National Congress
2014: Bishamber Singh, Bharatiya Janata Party

See also

 Bawani Khera
 Haryana Legislative Assembly
 Elections in Haryana
 Elections in India
 Lok Sabha
 Rajya Sabha
 Election Commission of India

References

Assembly constituencies of Haryana
Bhiwani district